The 2006 Players Championship was a golf tournament in Florida on the PGA Tour, held  at TPC Sawgrass in Ponte Vedra Beach, southeast of Jacksonville. It was the 33rd Players Championship. 

Stephen Ames shot a final round 67 and completed the biggest win of his career by a comfortable margin, six strokes ahead of runner-up Retief Goosen. Ames was the 54-hole leader by a stroke over Sergio García and Vijay Singh.

A month earlier at the WGC-Accenture Match Play Championship, Ames lasted only ten holes in the first round, falling to Tiger Woods 9&8.

Defending champion Fred Funk finished thirteen strokes back, in a tie for sixteenth place.

This was the final Players held in March until 2019; it moved to mid-May in 2007. The Players was moved back to March starting 2019 as the PGA Championship moves from August to May from 2019 onwards.

Venue

Field
Robert Allenby, Stephen Ames, Billy Andrade, Stuart Appleby, Tommy Armour III, Arjun Atwal, Woody Austin, Aaron Baddeley, Craig Barlow, Doug Barron, Rich Beem, Thomas Bjørn, Jason Bohn, Jeff Brehaut, Mark Brooks, Olin Browne, Bart Bryant, Jonathan Byrd, Ángel Cabrera, Mark Calcavecchia, Chad Campbell, Michael Campbell, K. J. Choi, Daniel Chopra, Stewart Cink, Tim Clark, Darren Clarke, Fred Couples, Ben Crane, Ben Curtis, John Daly, Robert Damron, Brian Davis, Luke Donald, James Driscoll, Joe Durant, David Duval, Ernie Els, Bob Estes, Nick Faldo, Brad Faxon, Todd Fischer, Steve Flesch, Carlos Franco, Harrison Frazar, Fred Funk, Jim Furyk, Robert Gamez, Sergio García, Brian Gay, Lucas Glover, Retief Goosen, Jason Gore, Nathan Green, Todd Hamilton, Pádraig Harrington, Dudley Hart, J. J. Henry, Mark Hensby, Tim Herron, J. B. Holmes, Charles Howell III, David Howell, John Huston, Ryuji Imada, Freddie Jacobson, Miguel Ángel Jiménez, Brandt Jobe, Richard S. Johnson, Zach Johnson, Kent Jones, Steve Jones, Shingo Katayama, Jonathan Kaye, Jerry Kelly, Hank Kuehne, Bernhard Langer, Stephen Leaney, Tom Lehman, Justin Leonard, J. L. Lewis, Peter Lonard, Davis Love III, Steve Lowery, Jeff Maggert, Shigeki Maruyama, Billy Mayfair, Scott McCarron, Paul McGinley, Rocco Mediate, Shaun Micheel, Phil Mickelson, Colin Montgomerie, Kevin Na, Sean O'Hair, Nick O'Hern, Arron Oberholser, Joe Ogilvie, Geoff Ogilvy, José María Olazábal, Greg Owen, Ryan Palmer, Rod Pampling, Jesper Parnevik, Craig Parry, Corey Pavin, Pat Perez, Craig Perks, Tom Pernice Jr., Tim Petrovic, Carl Pettersson, Ian Poulter, Nick Price, Ted Purdy, Brett Quigley, Tag Ridings, Loren Roberts, John Rollins, Justin Rose, Rory Sabbatini, Adam Scott, John Senden, Patrick Sheehan, Wes Short Jr., Joey Sindelar, Vijay Singh, Heath Slocum, Jeff Sluman, Henrik Stenson, Kevin Sutherland, Hidemichi Tanaka, Vaughn Taylor, David Toms, D. J. Trahan, Kirk Triplett, Bob Tway, Bo Van Pelt, Scott Verplank, Camilo Villegas, Charles Warren, Mike Weir, Lee Westwood, Dean Wilson, Tiger Woods

Round summaries

First round
Thursday, March 23, 2006

Source:

Second round
Friday, March 24, 2006

Source:

Third round
Saturday, March 25, 2006

Source:

Final round
Sunday, March 26, 2006

Scorecard 

Cumulative tournament scores, relative to par
{|class="wikitable" span = 50 style="font-size:85%;
|-
|  style="background:Red; width:10px;"|
|Eagle
|  style="background:Pink; width:10px;"|
|Birdie
|  style="background:PaleGreen; width:10px;"|
|Bogey
|  style="background:Green; width:10px;"|
|Double bogey
|  style="background:Olive; width:10px;"|
|Triple bogey+
|}

References

External links
The Players Championship website
Full Leaderboard

2006
2006 in golf
2006 in American sports
2006 in sports in Florida
March 2006 sports events in the United States